At the 2003 Military World Games, the track and field events were held at the Stadio Angelo Massimino in Catania, Italy, from 6 – 8 December 2003. The marathon races were held outside of the stadium, taking place in neighbouring Palermo. A total of 35 events were contested, of which 22 by male and 13 by female athletes.

Russia topped the medal table with nine golds and 23 medals in total – more than double their nearest competitor. The hosts Italy took second place on the medal table with four golds and nine medals in total. Kenya was the next most successful nation, having won four golds in men's track events, although they also secured a silver in the men's 4×100 metres relay – an event the country is historically weak at.

Compared to previous editions, several changes were made to the events programme: the men's 20 m road walk was replaced with a 10,000 m track walk, while the women's programme saw the addition of the 400 metres hurdles, triple jump, hammer throw and 5000 m track walk. The women's shot put contest was dropped for this addition. Wind and downpours of rain affected much of the competition, with Ryan Kirkpatrick of the United States remarking that "the conditions are just above miserable". As a result, performances were below usual standards and although seven new Games records were set, five of these were in newly introduced events. Mihaela Botezan of Romania was the only Games record-breaker at the Angelo Massimino stadium, completing the 5000 metres in 15:10.69, while the other Games record was broken by Francesco Ingargiola in the men's marathon in Palermo.

Records

Medal summary

Men

Women

 † Note: Omolade Akinremi represented the USA as a member of the United States Air Force, although she holds Nigerian nationality.

Medal table

References

Results
 CISM Military World Games - Athletics results. GBRAthletics. Retrieved on 2010-07-25.
 3rd Military World Games (archived). CISM. Retrieved on 2014-11-21.

External links
 Archived official website

2003 Military World Games
Military World Games
2003
2003 Military World Games